Ålhus is a small village in the municipality of Sunnfjord in Vestland county, Norway.

Ålhus is the millennium site of Jølster, due to its historical significance.  Audun Hugleiksson erected a stone castle called Audunborg here in the 13th century. Ålhus Church, the oldest church in the municipality, is also located here. Nikolai Astrup, the famous Norwegian painter, grew up here.

References

Villages in Vestland
Sunnfjord